Steventon  may refer to:
Steventon, Hampshire, England
Steventon, Oxfordshire (formerly Berkshire), England
Steventon, Shropshire, England

See also
Stevenston, Scotland